Keep On Walking or Keep On Walkin' may refer to:

 [[Keep On Walkin' (album)|Keep On Walkin''' (album)]], 2008 album and its title song by The Grascals
 "Keep On Walking" (Salem Al Fakir song)
 "Keep On Walking" (Scouting for Girls song)
 "Keep On Walkin'" (song), song by CeCe Peniston
 "Keep On Walking", 1975 song by Gino Vannelli from Storm at Sunup "Keep On Walkin'", 1992 single release by Mike Reid from Twilight Town''